Eugenia brevistyla is a species of plant in the family Myrtaceae. It is endemic to Brazil. Under its synonym Calycorectes australis, it was regarded as endangered, being threatened by habitat loss.

References

Endemic flora of Brazil
brevistyla
Endangered plants
Taxonomy articles created by Polbot
Taxobox binomials not recognized by IUCN